IMFI is an acronym for "Initial, Medial, Final, Isolated", a writing system in which each character has four different potential shapes:

 initial – used for the first character in a word
 medial – used in the middle of a word
 final – used for the last character in a word
 isolated – used for single-letter words

The Arabic and Syriac script are examples of IMFI writing systems. 

Writing systems